4-Phosphopantoate—β-alanine ligase (phosphopantothenate synthetase, TK1686 protein) is an enzyme with systematic name (R)-4-phosphopantoate:beta-alanine ligase (AMP-forming). This enzyme catalyses the following chemical reaction

 ATP + (R)-4-phosphopantoate + β-alanine  AMP + diphosphate + (R)-4'-phosphopantothenate

The conversion of (R)-pantoate to (R)-4'-phosphopantothenate is part of the pathway leading to biosynthesis of 4'-phosphopantetheine.

References

External links 
 

EC 6.3.2